Crook is an unincorporated community in Osage County, in the U.S. state of Missouri.

History
A post office called Crook was established in 1903, and remained in operation until 1920. The community was derisively named Crook (meaning "thief") on account of the business practices of a local merchant.

References

Unincorporated communities in Osage County, Missouri
Unincorporated communities in Missouri
Jefferson City metropolitan area